Jazz Long Playing is the debut album by French violinist Jean-Luc Ponty recorded in Paris in June and July 1964. It was reissued in 2000. Jazz Long Playing is one of two albums produced by Ponty; Sunday Walk in 1967 was his second.

Track listing
 "Une nuit au violin" (Martial Solal) – 4:43
 "Modo Azul" (Jef Gilson) – 4:38
 "Spanish Castels" (George Gruntz) – 3:40
 "Sniffin' the Blues" (Jef Gilson) – 3:28
 "Postlude in C" (Raymond Fol) – 3:21
 "Au Privave" (Charlie Parker) – 3:45
 "Manoir de mes rêves" (Django Reinhardt) – 3:05
 "YTNOP Blues" (Jean-Luc Ponty) – 3:10
 "I Want to Talk About You" (Billy Eckstine) – 3:48
 "A Night in Tunisia" (Dizzy Gillespie) – 3:02
 "Satin Doll" (Duke Ellington) – 4:20

Tracks 1 & 3 recorded June 1, 1964.
Tracks 2 & 6 recorded June 17, 1964.
Tracks 4, 8 & 11 recorded June 15, 1964.
Tracks 5, 7, 8 & 10 recorded July 6, 1964.

Personnel
 Jean-Luc Ponty – acoustic violin (tracks 2, 4-11), electric violin (tracks 1, 3)
 Michel Portal – flute (tracks 2, 6)
 Eddy Louiss – piano (tracks 1-3, 5-8, 10); organ(tracks 4, 9, 11)
 Gilbert Rovère – double bass (tracks 1-4, 6, 9, 11)
 Guy Pedersen – double bass (tracks 5, 7, 8, 10)
 Daniel Humair – drums

Production
 Producer: Daniel Richard
 Recorded by François Dentan
 Photography by Stan Wiezniak
 Liner notes by Jean Tronchot

References

External links 
 Jean-Luc Ponty - Jazz Long Playing (1964) album review by Ken Dryden, credits & releases at AllMusic
 Jean-Luc Ponty - Jazz Long Playing (1964) album releases & credits at Discogs
 Jean-Luc Ponty - Jazz Long Playing (1964) album credits & user reviews at ProgArchives.com
 Jean-Luc Ponty - Jazz Long Playing (1964) album to be listened as stream on Spotify

Jean-Luc Ponty albums
1964 debut albums
Bebop albums
Philips Records albums